Haskell Ridge is a rocky ridge  west of Colosseum Ridge in the Darwin Mountains of Antarctica. It was mapped by the Victoria University of Wellington Antarctic Expedition (1962–63) and named after T.R. Haskell, a member of the expedition.

Further reading 
 Gunter Faure, Teresa M. Mensing, The Transantarctic Mountains: Rocks, Ice, Meteorites and Water, P 298

References

Ridges of Oates Land